Saint George's Church is a Romanian Orthodox church in Streisângeorgiu village, Călan town, Hunedoara County, Romania.

The church was begun at the end of the 11th century and has a simplified Romanesque nave. There is a bell-tower on the eastern side, built of stone blocks held together by mortar. The altar, also facing east, is rectangular.

Notes 

Călan
Romanian Orthodox churches in Hunedoara County
Buildings and structures in Hunedoara County
Historic monuments in Hunedoara County
11th-century Eastern Orthodox church buildings